The Circle Game is the 1968 album from folk rock musician Tom Rush. He covers three songs from fellow singer-songwriter Joni Mitchell, as well as songs by Jackson Browne and James Taylor. Rush himself wrote "Rockport Sunday" and his classic, often-covered tune "No Regrets" which has become a folk standard and has been covered by several dozen artists, including Emmylou Harris, The Walker Brothers, Olivia Newton-John, indie-pop group Luna, and Curtis Stigers. In addition to his original rendition here, Rush himself later made a radically different version for Columbia Records featuring a screaming electric guitar solo.

Background

The songs follow the cycle of a relationship from its beginning to an end, according to the lyric content and sequencing of songs. Joni Mitchell's "The Circle Game", recorded prior to her own more upbeat release of the song on her 1970 album Ladies of the Canyon, can be read as the turning point of the relationship while "Rockport Sunday" ends the romance using an instrumental piece, followed by the coda "No Regrets". Supporting this concept is the cover shot, which pictures his then girlfriend Jill Lumpkin behind Rush as photographed by Linda Eastman.

On 9 May 2008, Rhino/Warner released a fully remastered 40th Anniversary Edition. Three bonus tracks were added, including the single versions of "Something in the Way She Moves" and "Urge for Going", plus a previously unreleased acoustic first take of "The Circle Game".  In addition, the 42-second instrumental coda to "No Regrets", which ends the original album, appears for the first time on CD.

The Circle Game was Rush's highest charting album, It was on the charts for 14 weeks, reaching No. 68 on the Billboard 200 on 8 June 1968.

Track listing
"Tin Angel"  (Joni Mitchell) – 3:22
"Something in the Way She Moves"  (James Taylor) – 3:25
"Urge for Going"  (Joni Mitchell) – 5:50
"Sunshine, Sunshine"  (James Taylor) – 2:55
"The Glory of Love"  (Billy Hill) – 2:22
"Shadow Dream Song"  (Jackson Browne) – 3:24
"The Circle Game"  (Joni Mitchell) – 5:12
"So Long"  (Charlie Rich) – 2:55
"Rockport Sunday"  (Tom Rush) – 4:34
"No Regrets"  (Tom Rush) – 3:50

40th Anniversary Edition Bonus Tracks
Instrumental coda to "No Regrets" – 0:42
"Something in the Way She Moves" (Single Version) – 3:31
"Urge for Going" (Single Version) – 3:37
"The Circle Game" (Take One) – 5:34

Personnel
Musicians
 Tom Rush – guitar, vocals
 Hugh McCracken – electric guitar
 Don Thomas – electric guitar
 Jonathan Raskin – classical guitar, bass
 Bruce Langhorne – acoustic guitar
 Eric Gale – electric guitar
 Joe Grimm – saxophone
 Joe Mack – bass
 Bob Bushnell – bass
 Paul Harris – keyboards, arrangements, conductor
 Buddy Lucas – saxophone
 Herbie Lovelle – drums
 Bernard Purdie – drums
 Richie Ritz – drums

Technical
 Arthur Gorson – producer 
 Bruce Botnick – engineer
 Brooks Arthur – engineer
 Jac Holzman – production supervisor
 Zal Schreiber – mastering
 Linda McCartney (née Eastman) – photography
 William S. Harvey – cover design

References

Tom Rush albums
1968 albums
Elektra Records albums